Atlit (original title: Rendez-vous à Atlit) is a 2014 Franco-Israeli drama film written and directed by Shirel Amitaï. It stars Géraldine Nakache, Judith Chemla and Yaël Abecassis.

Cast 
 Géraldine Nakache as Cali
 Judith Chemla as Asia
 Yaël Abecassis as Darel
 Arsinée Khanjian as Mona
 Pippo Delbono as Zack
 Makram Khoury as Mafous
 Pini Tavgar as Dan
 Yossi Marshak as Amos

References

External links 
 

2014 films
2014 drama films
2010s French-language films
2010s Hebrew-language films
French drama films
Israeli drama films
Films set in Israel
2014 directorial debut films
2014 multilingual films
French multilingual films
Israeli multilingual films
2010s French films